Fumigation is a method of pest control or the removal of harmful micro-organisms by completely filling an area with gaseous pesticides—or fumigants—to suffocate or poison the pests within. It is used to control pests in buildings (structural fumigation), soil, grain, and produce. Fumigation is also used during the processing of goods for import  or export to prevent the transfer of exotic organisms. Structural fumigation targets pests inside buildings (usually residences), including pests that inhabit the physical structure itself, such as woodborers and drywood termites. Commodity fumigation, on the other hand, is also to be conducted inside a physical structure, such as a storage unit, but it aims to eliminate pests from infesting physical goods, usually food products, by killing pests within the container which will house them. Each fumigation lasts for a certain duration. This is because after spraying the pesticides, or fumigants, only the pests around are eradicated.

Process

Fumigation generally involves the following phases: first, humans are evacuated from the area intended for fumigation and the area covered to create a sealed environment. Next, the fumigant is released into the space to be fumigated. The space is held for a set period while the fumigant gas percolates through the space and acts on/kills any infestation in the area. Finally, the space is ventilated so that the poisonous gases are allowed to escape from the space, rendering it safe for humans to enter. If successful, the fumigated area is now safe and pest free.

Tent fumigation

Structural fumigation techniques differ from building to building. In a residential setting, a "rubber" tent or tents, typically made of plastic/pvc coated canvas material, may be placed over the entire house while the pesticides are being released into the vacant residence. This process is called tent fumigation, or "tenting". The sealed tent concentrates the poisonous gases and prevents them from escaping into the neighborhood. The process can take up to a week depending on the fumigant used, which is in turn dependent on the temperature and the pest.

Operating theatres  
Fumigation of hospital rooms with high concentrations of toxic chemicals has been proposed to reduce microbial agents on hospital surfaces and to control surgical site infections. Formaldehyde fumigation has long been an accepted method for areas where microbiological cleanliness is required. Fumigation with formaldehyde vapor is the recognized and most commonly used method because it is a cost-effective procedure.  However, alternative methods are sought due to safety and efficacy concerns. Vaporized hydrogen peroxide is a dry gaseous method that has been used as a reliable alternative for aseptic processing isolators, and more recently, for room/facility decontamination. Hydrogen peroxide and silver in solution and diluted in water is a non-toxic and low cost agent. For example, to fumigate a 1000ft3 (~28.32 m3) area, a 20% solution (200mL of solution in 1000mL demineralized water) would be sprayed via fogger for 30 minutes. Fogging may be done at a rate of up to 130mL/minute and the contact time should be at least one hour.

Chemicals
Methyl bromide was among the most widely used fumigants until its production and use was restricted by the Montreal Protocol due to its role in ozone depletion.
 1,3-dichloropropene
 dazomet (methyl isothiocyanate precursor)
chloropicrin
 DBCP
 formaldehyde
 hydrogen cyanide
 iodoform
 methyl isocyanate
 phosphine
 sulfuryl fluoride
 sulfur dioxide

Safety
Fumigation is a hazardous operation. Generally it is a legal requirement that the operator who carries out the fumigation operation holds official certification to perform the fumigation, as the chemicals used are toxic to most forms of life, including humans.

Post operation ventilation of the area is a critical safety aspect of fumigation. It is important to distinguish between the pack or source of the fumigant gas and the environment which has been fumigated. While the fumigant pack may be safe and spent, the space will still hold the fumigant gas until it has been ventilated.

See also
 ISPM 15
 FAO Fumigation Manual
 Health and safety guidance for employers and technicians carrying out fumigation operations (‘Contains public sector information published by the Health and Safety Executive and licensed under the Open Government Licence’)

Early publication
 W. G. Johnson, Fumigation Methods (New York, 1902)

References

External links

 National Pesticide Information Center

Pest control techniques
Pesticides
 

es:Fumigación